Abdurahman Ali (born 6 June 1911, date of death unknown) was a Filipino swimmer. He competed in the men's 100 metre freestyle at the 1932 Summer Olympics. He was killed in action during World War II.

References

External links
 

1911 births
Year of death missing
Filipino male swimmers
Olympic swimmers of the Philippines
Swimmers at the 1932 Summer Olympics
People from Sulu
Filipino military personnel killed in World War II
20th-century Filipino people